Christine Appleby (née Hardman) is a fictional character from the British ITV soap opera Coronation Street. She was played by Christine Hargreaves between 1960 and 1963.

Creation

Casting
Salford-born 21-year-old Christine Hargreaves was one of the first actors to read for creator Tony Warren's new script 'Florizel Street' (later renamed Coronation Street), and even played the part of Christine in the dry runs, before the show was commissioned for broadcast, alongside Pat Phoenix and Doris Speed, among others.

Storylines

Christine was born in 1939. Her family lived at 13 Coronation Street, Weatherfield since 1927, and Christine attended Bessie Street School, where she was close friends with Ken Barlow (William Roache). Her father, George Hardman, was a bank teller. In 1953 he had saved enough money to buy a grocery shop and a detached house in Oakhill. In 1955 George died from a heart attack and Christine and her mother May (Joan Heath) had had to sell the house and shop and move back to No. 13 Coronation Street.

Christine coped with the move better than May, who was too ashamed to face the neighbors. Christine spent the next few years looking after her mother, who constantly dwelled on the past and eventually suffered a breakdown. Christine got a job as a machinist at Elliston's Raincoat Factory. By 1960 her mother's health and the gossip in the street weighed heavily on her mind. May died of a brain tumour at the end of the year.

May's death was a shock for Christine, who now had to manage the house and money on her own. The neighbors—especially Esther Hayes (Daphne Oxenford)—helped her. One of these neighbors was plumber Joe Makinson (Brian Rawlinson), who did her plumbing for free. He also asked her out on a date. Christine was worried that he was taking advantage, but agreed to date, and a relationship soon emerged. Joe proposed after a short time, and Christine dumped him as they weren't quite on the same level.

Later in 1961, Christine met Ken Barlow at the train station. He intended to move to London to get away from the expectations of his family in the wake of Ida Barlow's (Noel Dyson) death. Christine convinced him to stay.

Despite taking control of her life and coping well, Christine was unhappy. She did not like the repetitive and dull work at Elliston's, and in 1962 she started wondering how people could be happy with their lives living in Coronation Street. In June, she climbed up onto the roof of the factory, intending to jump off, but she was talked down by Ken, who reminded her how she had stopped him from making a big mistake. He had sometimes wanted better things from life as well, but told her she shouldn't give up.

After the rooftop incident, Christine quit her job at the factory and tried to live life differently. An old flame of Christine's, Colin Appleby (Lawrence James), read about Christine in the newspaper, and met up with her. Christine seized the opportunity and decided to move out of Weatherfield when the relationship got serious. The pair settled in Leeds and eloped two weeks later, but Colin was killed in a car crash in October. Christine returned to Coronation Street and took a job at Miami Modes with Elsie Tanner (Pat Phoenix) and Dot Greenhalgh (Joan Francis).

The residents were shocked when Christine went out with Ken's father Frank Barlow (Frank Pemberton) in 1963 because Frank was twice her age and Christine was previously been interested in Ken. Frank was enthusiastic about the relationship, and Christine went along with it, but she was still confused about what she wanted now that Colin was dead. Frank was always one step ahead, already thinking about marriage, which almost alienated him from Ken. The news sent neighbourhood gossip into overdrive, and Elsie decided to spread the news that Christine had another boyfriend so that Christine and Frank would have peace. Frank popped the question to Christine, but she didn't answer him right away. Before she decided, Christine met up with Joe Makinson again and couldn't decide whom to choose. She was going to reject Joe, but he dumped her first, leading her to accept Frank's proposal.

The gossip became so bad that Christine wrote a letter to the landlord of No.11, where she was living with Elsie, informing him that she was living there illegally. this resulted in her having to move out. Christine soon realised that she didn't love Frank and only saw him as a possible means to get out of the street for good. She decided to be honest with him and called off the engagement.

Christine eventually got out of the street when she was promoted at Miami Modes and butted heads with Elsie and Dot, who didn't like the way she used her newfound authority. Christine was transferred and after briefly sharing a flat with old friend Esther Hayes, left Weatherfield for good.

Christine sent a telegram to congratulate Elsie and Steve Tanner (Paul Maxwell) on their wedding day in 1967. When Esther returned for Valerie Barlow's (Anne Reid) funeral in 1971, she revealed that Christine now lived in Southampton. In 1973, Lucille Hewitt (Jennifer Moss) mentioned that she had since remarried and had children.

References

Coronation Street characters
Television characters introduced in 1960
Fictional machinists
Fictional factory workers
Female characters in television